The 2015–16 Melbourne Renegades season is the fifth in the club's history. Coached by David Saker and captained by Aaron Finch, they competed in the BBL's 2015–16 season.

Summary
David Saker was unveiled as the new coach for the Renegades in the 2015–16 Big Bash League season. The Renegades also signed experienced players Cameron White, Xavier Doherty and Chris Gayle to strengthen their squad.

Fixtures

Pre-season

Regular season

Ladder

Ladder progress

Squad information
The following is the Renegades men squad for the 2015–16 Big Bash League season as of 31 December 2015.

Season statistics

Most runs

Source: ESPNcricinfo, 24 January 2016

Most wickets

Source: ESPNcricinfo, 24 January 2016.

Home attendance

TV audience

References

External links
 Official website of the Melbourne Renegades
 Official website of the Big Bash League

Melbourne Renegades seasons